Tetraphalerites is an extinct genus of ommatine archostematan beetle. It contains only one species, Tetraphalerites oligocenicus described by Roy Crowson in 1962 for a specimen from the Priabonian (late Eocene) aged Insect Limestone, Bembridge Marls of the Isle of Wight, UK.

References 

Ommatidae
Prehistoric beetle genera
Taxa named by Roy Crowson
Fossil taxa described in 1962